Jacob Jones (born May 9, 1949) is an American former professional basketball player. He played for the Philadelphia 76ers and Cincinnati Royals during the 1971–72 season after his collegiate career at Assumption College.

References

External links
 
 Jake Jones '61 – "Alumni Profile", Assumption College

1949 births
Living people
American men's basketball players
Assumption Greyhounds men's basketball players
Basketball players from New Jersey
Cincinnati Royals players
Neptune High School alumni
People from Neptune Township, New Jersey
Philadelphia 76ers draft picks
Philadelphia 76ers players
Shooting guards
Sportspeople from Monmouth County, New Jersey
Universiade medalists in basketball
Universiade silver medalists for the United States
Medalists at the 1970 Summer Universiade